"Cat Adams" is the joint pen name of American authors C.T. Adams and Cathy Clamp, a concept that came to fruition in 1997, when they began writing as a team. As "Cat Adams" they are the authors of the contemporary fantasy series, Blood Singer. They have also published fantasy and paranormal romance books under their own names. The "Cat Adams" book, Touch of Madness, was given the 2007 Contemporary Paranormal Romance Award by the magazine, Romantic Times.

Clamp lives in the Texas Hill Country and Adams lives in metropolitan Denver.

Bibliography

As Cat Adams

Stand Alone Novels 
 Abiding Lilac (2011)
 Magic's Design, Tor Paranormal Romance, 2009

The Blood Singer

As C.T. Adams and Cathy Clamp

Stand Alone Novels 

 Roads to Riches: The Great Railroad Race to Aspen, Western Reflections, (2003)
 Ease the Rage (2008) – Also in The Mammoth Book of Vampire Romance
 Daniel (2009) – Also in Mammoth Book of Paranormal Romance

Tales of the Sazi

Thrall
 Touch of Evil, Tor Paranormal Romance, 2006
 Touch of Madness, Tor Paranormal Romance, 2007
 Touch of Darkness, Tor Paranormal Romance, 2008

As C.T. Adams

Stand Alone Novels 
 Olga (2011)

Non-fiction 
 Ad Astra: The 50th Anniversary SFWA Cookbook (2015) – Cat Rambo et al.

The Fae 
 The Exile (2015) – Tor-Forge
 The Rescue (2020)

In Collaboration With A.S. James 
 Black & Blue (2017)
 Family Trouble (2017)
 A Nasty Little Murder (2017)
 Brutal Cold (2020)

As Cathy Clamp

Stand Alone Novels 
 Fare Thee Well (2010)
 Error 404: Page Found (2010)

Luna Lake 
 Forbidden: A Novel of the Sazi (2015)
 Illicit: A Novel of the Sazi (2016)
 Denied (2018)

Anthologies and collections

References

External links
 Cat Adams' website
 Cat Adams on the Macmillan website

Fantasy shared pseudonyms